Aarti Gupta, known also as Aarti S. Gupta, is a model and titleholder of Miss Teen India International 2014.

Biography
Gupta was born in the United States, and resides in New Jersey. Her family can be traced back to Kanpur, Uttar Pradesh in India, Aarti is also a citizen of India. Gupta represented India on an international level at Miss Teen International in 2014. She is the former Ambassador for Hope For Hansen's. She has also modeled for fashion events, such as Fashion Week.

References

Living people
1997 births
Miss International
Indian beauty pageant winners